The Cycloteuthidae are a family in the order Oegopsida, comprising two genera. While physically dissimilar, molecular evidence supports the relatedness of the genera. The family is found primarily in mesopelagic tropical to subtropical waters. Cycloteuthidae are characterised by a triangular funnel locking apparatus.

Species
Genus Cycloteuthis
Cycloteuthis akimushkini *
Cycloteuthis sirventi *
Genus Discoteuthis
Discoteuthis discus *
Discoteuthis laciniosa
Discoteuthis sp. A *
Discoteuthis sp. B

The entries listed above with an asterisk (*) are questionable and need further study to determine if they are valid or synonyms.

References

External links

Tree of Life web project: Cycloteuthidae

Squid
Cephalopod families
Taxa named by Adolf Naef